The 2020 Canterbury Cup NSW was the twelfth season of the New South Wales Cup, the top rugby league competition administered by the New South Wales Rugby League. The competition acts as a second-tier league to the ten New South Wales-based National Rugby League clubs, as well the Canberra Raiders and New Zealand Warriors. The competition will consist of 24 regular season rounds that will begin on 14 March and end on 30 August, they will be followed by 4 playoff rounds beginning on 5 September and ending with the grand final on 27 September. Newtown Jets are the defending premiers. On 27 March 2020 the New South Wales Rugby League opted to cancel the remainder of the season because of the COVID-19 pandemic.

Teams

Ladder

Ladder progression 

 Numbers highlighted in green indicate that the team finished the round inside the top 8.
 Numbers highlighted in blue indicates the team finished first on the ladder in that round.
 Numbers highlighted in red indicates the team finished last place on the ladder in that round.
 Underlined numbers indicate that the team had a bye during that round.

Round 1

Round 2

Round 3

Round 4

Round 5

Round 6

Round 7

Round 8

Round 9

Round 10

Round 11

Round 12

Round 13

Round 14

Round 15

Round 16

Round 17

Round 18

Round 19

Round 20

Round 21

Round 22

Round 23

Round 24

Major NSWRL Competitions

Ron Massey Cup (2nd Grade)

Standings

Finals series

Sydney Shield (3rd Grade)

Standings

Finals series

Women's Premiership

Standings

Finals series

Jersey Flegg Cup (Under 20s) - Cancelled

Standings

NSWRL Junior Reps

SG Ball Cup (Under 18s) - Cancelled

Standings

Harold Matthews Cup (Under 16s) - Cancelled

Standings

Tarsha Gale Cup (Girls Under 18s) - Cancelled

Standings

NSWRL Country Championships

Men's Country Championships (Under 23s) - Cancelled

Northern Group Standings

Southern Group Standings

Women's Country Championships - Cancelled

Northern Group Standings

Southern Group Standings

Laurie Daley Cup (Under 18s) - Cancelled

Northern Group Standings

Southern Group Standings

Andrew Johns Cup (Under 16s) - Cancelled

Northern Group Standings

Southern Group Standings

References

2020 in Australian rugby league
Rugby league in New South Wales
Rugby league competitions in New South Wales